Skip Ltd. (stylized as skip Ltd.) is a Japanese video game developer that has a close relationship with Nintendo. Nintendo has published all of their Japanese releases; with the only notable exception being LOL (Archime DS), which skip Ltd. published independently. The company's staff includes prominent developers from Square such as Kenichi Nishi and Keita Eto. In October 2019, it was reported OneControllerPort.com that the company had changed its name to Skip Inc. the previous year and had become inactive on all social media. By August 2020, there were growing signs that the company may have become defunct as they hadn't released a game since 2015, however this has not yet been officially confirmed.

Games

References

 
Video game companies established in 2000
Japanese companies established in 2000
Nintendo divisions and subsidiaries
Video game companies of Japan
Video game development companies